The 3 March 2010 Baqubah bombings were a series of three bombings in Baqubah, Iraq, on 3 March 2010 that killed at least 33 people and injured 55 others.

The bombings occurred in the lead-up to the parliamentary elections scheduled for 7 March 2010. At 9:45 am local time, a car bomb was detonated near a police station in the western part of the city. A suicide bomber later detonated a bomb at the hospital where some of the wounded were being treated. The hospital bomber posed as a police lieutenant and rode an ambulance to the hospital. A fourth bomb was found near the hospital and defused.

After the bombings, a full curfew was imposed on the city of Baqubah, barring even pedestrians.  Among the dead were ten policemen, and Dr. Ali al-Timimi, head of Diyala Governorate's health department.

The perpetrator of the bombings has yet to be identified, but Al-Qaeda in Iraq had previously promised to disrupt the elections on 7 March.  Authorities, both American and Iraqi, have reportedly warned that more attacks could occur before, and even after the elections.  Despite the concerns, early voting began, as scheduled, the morning of 4 March.

United States response
Pentagon spokesman Geoff Morrell said "It's disgraceful, it's deplorable. We strongly condemn it, that said, neither this attack nor any of the previous attempts to derail the electoral process and to destabilise the government have been or will be successful."

See also
 List of terrorist incidents, 2010
 Terrorist incidents in Iraq in 2010
 2004 Baqubah bombing
 2008 Baquba bombings

References

2010 murders in Iraq
21st-century mass murder in Iraq
Mass murder in 2010
Terrorist incidents in Iraq in 2010
Suicide car and truck bombings in Iraq
Suicide bombings in Iraq
Violence against Shia Muslims in Iraq
March 2010 events in Iraq